Jacqueline Desmarais,  (September 20, 1928 – March 3, 2018) was a Canadian billionaire, and long-term supporter of music and opera.

Early life
She was born Jacqueline Maranger in Sudbury, Ontario, to Ernest Marenger and Albertine Thanase, on September 20, 1928.

Career
According to Forbes, Desmarais had a net worth of $4.2 billion in January 2015.

She was a long-term supporter of music and opera in Canada, and head of the guild of the Montreal Symphony Orchestra from 1989 to 1999. In 1997, she created a foundation in her name to support young opera singers.

Honours
 In 2011, Desmarais was awarded a Knight of the Legion of Honour from the French President Nicolas Sarkozy, who called her "a great friend to France and a great lady of the arts".
 In 2011, she received an honorary doctorate from the Université de Montréal's faculty of music.
 In 2012, she was made a Grand Officer of the National Order of Quebec.
 In 2013, Desmarais was named an officer of the Order of Canada. In 2016, she was awarded a Companion of Quebec's Order of Arts and Letters.
 In 2016, Montreal's Sainte-Justine Hospital christened the Jacqueline Desmarais Pavilion.

Personal life
On September 8, 1953, at Notre-de-Dame-de-Grâce, Quebec, she wed the financier Paul Desmarais (1927-2013), also a native of Sudbury.

They had two sons: Paul Jr. and André (who is married to Canadian former Prime Minister Jean Chrétien's daughter France) and two daughters, Sophie and Louise.

Jacqueline Desmarais lived on a 75-acre estate at Domaine Laforest à Sagard, Charlevoix, Quebec, until her death in 2018.

Death
Jacqueline Desmarais died on March 3, 2018, aged 89.

References

1928 births
2018 deaths
Canadian billionaires
Female billionaires
Canadian socialites
Jacqueline
Businesspeople from Greater Sudbury
Businesspeople from Quebec
French Quebecers
Grand Officers of the National Order of Quebec
Officers of the Order of Canada
Chevaliers of the Légion d'honneur